James Atlee Phillips (1915 – May 26, 1991) was an American writer who used the pseudonym Philip Atlee for the "Contract" series of spy novels.

Atlee was born in Fort Worth, Texas and attended University of Texas at Austin, Texas Christian University and the University of Missouri.  In World War II he worked for China National Airlines in Rangoon and later ran the national airline in Myanmar (then called Burma).

The "Contract" series featured former spy Joe Gall, who comes out of retirement to take on specific jobs.  There were twenty-nine novels in the series, published from 1963 to 1976 by Gold Medal Books.  The White Wolverine Contract was nominated for the 1972 Edgar Award for best paperback original.  

Phillips was the father of Shawn Phillips and the brother of CIA officer David Atlee Phillips.

Bibliography

As James Atlee Phillips (incomplete):

 The Case of the Shivering Chorus Girls (1942)
 Suitable for Framing (1950)
 Pagoda (1951)
 The Deadly Mermaid (1954)

As Philip Atlee (all published by Gold Medal):

 The Green Wound (reprinted as The Green Wound Contract) (1963)
 The Silken Baroness (reprinted as The Silken Baroness Contract) (1966)
 The Death Bird Contract (1966)
 The Paper Pistol Contract (1966)
 The Irish Beauty Contract (1966)
 The Star Ruby Contract (1967)
 The Rockabye Contract (1968)
 The Skeleton Coast Contract (1968)
 The Ill Wind Contract (1969)
 The Trembling Earth Contract (1969)
 The Fer-de-Lance Contract (1971)
 The Canadian Bomber Contract (1971)
 The White Wolverine Contract (1971)
 The Kiwi Contract (1972)
 The Judah Lion Contract (1973)
 The Spice Route Contract (1973)
 The Shankill Road Contract (1973)
 The Underground Cities Contract (1974)
 The Kowloon Contract (1974)
 The Black Venus Contract (1975)
 The Makassar Strait Contract (1976)
 The Last Domino Contract (1976)

Notes

External links
 

1915 births
1991 deaths
American spy fiction writers
American thriller writers
American male novelists
20th-century American male writers